Annika Maria Lundqvist (born 14 October 1963) is a Swedish actress and comedian. Born in Gothenburg, Lundqvist studied acting at the Gothenburg Theatre Academy and has since been acting at various Swedish theatres, including the Royal Dramatic Theatre in Stockholm. 

Her breakthrough as a comedian came when she portrayed a comic character named Sally in a TV-show with the same name in 1998. She has also starred in musicals in Sweden. For her film acting, she has received two Guldbagge awards. She had a leading role in the 2015 comedy film En underbar jävla jul.

She has four children, one of them is actor Anton Lundqvist.

Selected filmography

References

External links

Swedish actresses
1963 births
Living people
Best Actress Guldbagge Award winners
Best Supporting Actress Guldbagge Award winners
People from Gothenburg